Dilijan Football Club was an Armenian football club based in Dilijan, Tavush Province.

History
Dilijan was formed in November 2018, initially as a youth team, by British investor Will Thomson. Ahead of the 2019–20 season, Dilijan were admitted into the Armenian First League as part of an expansion of the league. Following a 16th place finish in the 2019–20 Armenian First League, Dilijan withdrew from senior football in Armenia.

Managerial history
  Gagik Grigoryan (2019–2020)

References

Defunct football clubs in Armenia
2018 establishments in Armenia
2020 disestablishments in Armenia
Association football clubs established in 2018
Association football clubs disestablished in 2020
Dilijan